General Fernando may refer to:

C. H. Fernando (1930–2020), Sri Lanka Army major general
Dampath Fernando (fl. 1980s–2010s), Sri Lanka Army major general
Percy Fernando (died 2000), Sri Lanka Army brigadier general (posthumously promoted to major general)
Priyanka Fernando (fl. 2000s–2020s), Sri Lanka Army major general
Rasika Fernando (fl. 1980s–2020s), Sri Lanka Army major general